Chikar is a small town and hill station in Jhelum valley District of Azad Kashmir, Pakistan. It is the headquarters of Tehsil Chikar.

The town is accessible from Muzaffarabad by Muzaffarabad-Chakothi road branches off at sarran bypass road link(named seri Ramsir chikar by pass) & Dhanni Baqallan. It is also accessible from Sudhan Gali.

Before partition of Indian subcontinent Chikar was very important town and was the biggest local trade centre. People from adjoining areas like Prem Kot used to trade over here.
Government School in Chikar was famous before 1947,many students used to study over here. Chikar can be considered as the most historically place of the jehlum valley region. It was the main trading centres of Hindus and Sikhs of Kashmir. Many villages in Chikar have the names which show Hindu roots like Ramsar, indrasari and Nagni etc. Census record of 1941 showed that considerable amount of non-Muslim were present in Chikar's adjoining areas.

The earth quake of 2005 Created a lake near to Chikar which is known as karli Jaheel or zalzaal lake.

A rest house of AJK Tourism & Archeology Department is under construction in village. Some private hotels with basic facilities are available here for tourists stay.

Notable caste families in this area are Thakiyal Rajpoot, Gujjars, Chohan, Dogras, Sheikh, Dar, Khawaja, Syed, Awaan, Chaudhary, Kayani, Famous Khakha  Rajpoot Clans are Siyal, Tezyal, Bakkal, Hatmaal are living here.

References

Populated places in Jhelum Valley District
Villages in Jhelum Valley District
Tehsils of Jhelum Valley District